The 2023 Faun-Ardèche Classic was the 23rd edition of the Classic Sud-Ardèche cycle race. It was held on 25 February 2023 as a category 1.Pro race on the UCI ProSeries. The race started and finished in Guilherand-Granges.

Teams
Twenty-one teams of up to seven riders started the race: fourteen UCI WorldTeams, five UCI ProTeams, and two UCI Continental. 106 riders finished out of the 138 who entered the race.

UCI WorldTeams

 
 
 
 
 
 
 
 
 
 
 
 
 
 

UCI ProTeams

 
 
 
 
 

UCI Continental Teams

Result

References

External links 
 

2023 in French sport
2023 UCI ProSeries
Classic Sud-Ardèche
February 2023 sports events in France